One Step Beyond . . . is the debut studio album by the British ska-pop group Madness, released by Stiff Records. Recorded and mixed in about three weeks, the album peaked at number two and remained on the U.K. Albums Chart for more than a year. The album has received much critical praise. It was ranked 90th in a 2005 survey held by British television's Channel 4 to determine the 100 greatest albums of all time.

This was the first album produced by the Clive Langer and Alan Winstanley team, who would go on to produce more Madness albums and to work with artists such as Elvis Costello and the Attractions, Morrissey, Dexys Midnight Runners, They Might Be Giants and David Bowie.

Background
The "Nutty Train" photo on the sleeve, shot by Cameron McVey, was inspired by a photo of Kilburn and the High Roads roadie Paul Tonkin that appeared on the back cover of the band's album Handsome.

The title track, released as a single, was originally written and recorded by the Jamaican ska musician Prince Buster, and its "Don't watch that, watch this ..." introduction is adapted from another Prince Buster song, "The Scorcher". The track "The Prince" is a tribute to Buster and a re-recording of the band's debut single, originally released on the 2 Tone label. Its B-side, "Madness", was also re-recorded for the album. "Madness" and "Bed and Breakfast Man" were released as singles in North America through Sire Records.  

After the album's initial release, reissues were released in 2009 and 2014 by Union Square Music's collector's label Salvo, each containing additional material such as video productions featuring the band.

Track listing

Extra material

The 2009 reissue also includes the music videos for "The Prince", "One Step Beyond", "My Girl", "Night Boat to Cairo" and "Bed and Breakfast Man". The first four of these were also included on the version of One Step Beyond... issued as part of the box set The Lot.
The bonus disc contains B-sides as well as all three songs previously only released on the Work Rest and Play EP in April 1980.

A 35th-anniversary edition was released in 2014. It includes 14 of 20 tracks from a 1979 rehearsal tape entitled "Fab Toones" and a DVD featuring videos,  Top of the Pops and Old Grey Whistle Test appearances and a BBC documentary.

2009 reissue
Disc 1 
The original album
The first disc contains the fifteen tracks from the original album plus five promo videos.
The promo videos

Disc 2 
The John Peel Session

The bonus tracks

Notes
Tracks 1-4 recorded 14 August 1979 at BBC's Maida Vale Studios.
Track 6 recorded at Pathway Studios during sessions for 2 Tone single "The Prince".

2014 reissue
Original album
Contains the fifteen tracks from the original album plus fourteen bonus tracks.

'Fab Toones!' rehearsal tape, 1979

All bonus tracks are previously unreleased and recorded in mono on a portable cassette recorder on 28 April 1979.
The remaining six tracks from "Fab Toones!" were not included on the CD due to space constraints. However, these tracks were available as downloads.

Downloads

Singles
Singles and EP from the album
 "The Prince" b/w "Madness" (2-Tone single version), August 1979
 "One Step Beyond" (single mix) b/w "Mistakes" on the 7" Single, "One Step Beyond" (12" Mix) b/w "Mistakes", "Nutty Theme" on the 12" single, October 1979
 "My Girl" b/w "Stepping Into Line" (plus "In the Rain" as an extra track on the UK 12" single), December 1979
 Work Rest and Play EP ("Night Boat To Cairo", "Deceives the Eye", "The Young and the Old" and "Don't Quote Me On That"), March 1980
 "Madness" b/w "Mistakes", US, March 1980 
 "Bed and Breakfast Man" b/w "Night Boat to Cairo", Canada, April 1980 
 "Tarzan's Nuts" b/w "Night Boat to Cairo" (Stiff 4338), The Netherlands, May 1980
 "Don't Quote Me On That" (4:08 Mix) b/w "Swan Lake", 1980

Music videos 
Five promotional music videos were filmed to promote the singles from this album. All of these, with the exception of “The Prince” (which was in fact a Top of the Pops performance only released in the UK) were in rotation on MTV during its first few years. Some of these promo videos were also featured in other music TV outlets, such as Top of the Pops.

Chart performance

Original album

30th Anniversary Deluxe Edition

Year-end charts

Singles

Certifications and sales

Personnel
 Graham "Suggs" McPherson – lead vocals
 Mike Barson – keyboards
 Chris Foreman – guitars
 Mark Bedford – bass
 Lee Thompson – saxophones, backing vocals, lead vocals on tracks 5 and 10
 Dan Woodgate – drums, percussion

Additional personnel
 Cathal "Chas Smash" Smyth – backing vocals, "various shouts and fancy footwork", lead vocals on tracks 1 and 15
NOTE:  Smyth was not an official member of the band at the time of the album's recording or release. He would formally join Madness only a few weeks after One Step Beyond... was issued in October 1979.
 John Hasler – minder

Technical
 Clive Langer – producer
 Alan Winstanley – producer
 Stiff Records – cover artwork
 Julian Balme – cover artwork
 Eddie King – cover artwork
 Cameron McVey – front cover and band photography
 Chris Gabrin – back cover photography

2009 reissue
 Tim Turan – remastering
 Bob Sargeant – producer on John Peel sessions
 Malcolm Brown – engineer on John Peel sessions
 Bob Jones – engineer on John Peel sessions 
 Madness – producer on bonus tracks 6 and 10
 Martin "Cally" Callomon – design, art direction
 Kerstin Rodgers – photography
 Irvine Welsh – liner notes 

2014 reissue
 Tim Turan – remastering
 Stevie Chick – liner notes

References

External links

1979 debut albums
Madness (band) albums
Stiff Records albums
Albums produced by Alan Winstanley
Albums produced by Clive Langer